Herbosa is a town in the Province of Burgos, within the Autonomous community of Castile and León, in central Spain. 

According to the census, it has a population of 695.

References

Populated places in the Province of Burgos